Jane Avril (9 June 186817 January 1943) was a French can-can dancer made famous by Henri de Toulouse-Lautrec through his paintings. Extremely thin, "given to jerky movements and sudden contortions", she was nicknamed La Mélinite, after an explosive.

Biography
She was born Jeanne Louise Beaudon on 9June 1868 in Belleville, in the 20th arrondissement of Paris (though her biographer, Jose Shercliff—whose account of the dancer's life is highly romanticised—employed the surname “Richepin” in her publication). Her mother Léontine Clarisse Beaudon was a prostitute who was known as "La Belle Élise", and her father was an Italian aristocrat named Luigi de Font who separated from her mother when Avril was two years old. Avril was raised by her grandparents in the countryside until her mother took her back with the intent of turning her into a prostitute.

Living in poverty and abused by her alcoholic mother, she ran away from home as a teenager, and was eventually admitted to the Salpêtrière Hospital in December 1882, with the movement disorder known as "St Vitus' Dance", with symptoms that included nervous tics, thrashing of limbs, and rhythmic swaying. Under the care of Dr.Jean-Martin Charcot, the expert on "female hysteria", she received various kinds of treatment, and claimed in her biography that, when she discovered dance at a social ball for employees and patients at the hospital celebrating Mardi Gras, she was cured, although a modern biography of her argues that this story is unlikely, as she was discharged in June 1884, months before any Mardi Gras celebration would take place.

Regardless, she incorporated some of the mannerisms into her dance style, but it is unclear if she was actually afflicted by the condition or if it was simply a marketing strategy, as nervous conditions such as hysteria were associated with elegance by writers of the time (or both), She was certainly known for her unusual style, which was described as "an orchid in a frenzy". The Belgian author Frantz Jourdain described her as "this exquisite creature, nervous and neurotic, the captivating flower of artistic corruption and of sickly grace".

On leaving the hospital, after a failed romance with a doctor, Avril pondered committing suicide, but was taken in by Parisian prostitutes. In 1888 she met the writer René Boylesve (18671926) who became her lover. Using the stage name Jane Avril, suggested by an English lover, she built a reputation that eventually allowed her to make a living as a full-time dancer. During this time she became known by various nicknames: La Mélinite after an explosive, L'Etrange ("The Strange One"), and  Jane la Folle ("Jane the Crazy").

Hired by the Moulin Rouge nightclub in 1889, within a few years she headlined at the Jardin de Paris, one of the major cafés-concerts on the Champs-Élysées. To advertise the extravaganza, Henri de Toulouse-Lautrec painted her portrait on a poster that elevated her stature in the entertainment world even further. The popularity of the can-can became such that Avril travelled with a dance troupe to perform in London in 1896.

In 1895, Louise Weber, known by her stage name La Goulue ("The Glutton") and the most famous dancer in Paris, left the Moulin Rouge, and Avril was chosen to replace her. Graceful, soft-spoken, and melancholic, Avril gave a dance presentation that was the opposite of the very boisterous La Goulue. Nevertheless, the club's patrons adored her, and she became one of the most recognizable names of the Parisian nightlife. A younger dancer, May Milton, arrived in Paris in 1895 and she and Avril had a short but passionate affair. From another liaison, she bore a son, and beginning in 1901, appeared in theatre, taking roles in Henrik Ibsen's Peer Gynt, as well as a stage adaptation of Claudine at School by Colette.

In 1905, she retired from performing altogether and married the French artist, Maurice Biais (18721926) in 1911, who adopted her son. They moved to a home in Jouy-en-Josas at the outskirts of Paris. However, Biais suffered from lung disease and the couple separated in the 1920s, with Biais moving to the south of France, where he died. She was interred in the Biais family plot in Paris' Père Lachaise Cemetery.

Zsa Zsa Gabor portrayed Avril in the original Moulin Rouge (1952); half a century later, the semi-fictionalized character was reinterpreted by Nicole Kidman in Moulin Rouge! (2001). Avril is one of the characters in Per Olov Enquist's book The Book of Blanche and Marie, which portrays the lives of Marie "Blanche" Wittman and Marie Curie.

Notes

References

Bibliography

Further reading

External links

 Jane Avril of the Moulin Rouge – dedicated website
Toulouse-Lautrec in the Metropolitan Museum of Art, a full-text exhibition catalog from The Metropolitan Museum of Art, which contains material on Jane Avril
 

1868 births
1943 deaths
Dancers from Paris
French artists' models
French female dancers
Burials at Père Lachaise Cemetery
French people with disabilities
Moulin Rouge
People of Montmartre
Bisexual women
Bisexual dancers
French LGBT entertainers
French bisexual people
19th-century French LGBT people
20th-century French LGBT people